Charles Watters (November 26, 1818 – August 7, 1891) was a lawyer, judge and political figure in New Brunswick. He represented Victoria County from 1856 to 1861 and the city of St. John from 1861 to 1865.

He was born and was educated in Saint John, New Brunswick, the son of Thomas Watters and Eleanor Toole, both immigrants from Ireland. He studied law with William Johnston Ritchie and was called to the bar in 1847. He served as a member of the Executive Council and was solicitor general from 1857 to 1863. In 1862, he married Malvina Priestly. Watters was named a county court judge in 1867 and judge in the vice admiralty court in 1876.

References 
The Canadian biographical dictionary and portrait gallery of eminent and self-made men ... (1881)

1818 births
1891 deaths
Members of the Legislative Assembly of New Brunswick
Judges in New Brunswick